Minitingis is a genus of lace bugs in the family Tingidae. There are at least two described species in Minitingis.

Species
These two species belong to the genus Minitingis:
 Minitingis elsae Froeschner, 1968
 Minitingis minusculus Barber, 1954

References

Further reading

 
 
 
 
 
 

Tingidae
Articles created by Qbugbot